The 1978 Furman Paladins football team was an American football team that represented Furman University as a member of the Southern Conference (SoCon) during the 1978 NCAA Division I-A football season. In their first year under head coach Dick Sheridan, the Paladins compiled an overall record of 8–3 with a conference mark of 4–1, winning a share of the SoCon title.

Schedule

References

Furman
Furman Paladins football seasons
Southern Conference football champion seasons
Furman Paladins football